Ernst Behler (4 September 1928 in Essen – 16 September 1997 in Seattle) was a German philosopher. In 1976 he became the founding Chairman of the Department of Comparative Literature at the University of Washington in Seattle. His research included Friedrich von Schlegel, Friedrich Nietzsche and the early Romanticism. Also notable are his books on irony: Irony and the discourse of modernity (1990), Klassische Ironie, romantische Ironie, tragische Ironie (1972), Ironie und literarische Moderne (1997).

1928 births
1997 deaths
Writers from Essen
Academic staff of the University of Bonn
University of Washington faculty
20th-century German philosophers
Continental philosophers
German male writers
German expatriates in the United States